Julien Boutter and Dominik Hrbatý were the defending champions but did not compete that year.

David Adams and Robbie Koenig won in the final 6–2, 7–5 against Raemon Sluiter and Martin Verkerk.

Seeds
Champion seeds are indicated in bold text while text in italics indicates the round in which those seeds were eliminated.

Draw

Finals

References

ATP Tashkent Open
2002 ATP Tour